Mohit Kishore Thadani (born 2 July 1991) is a Rajasthani cricketer. He plays for Gujarat and made his debut in First-class cricket on 20 January 2017 against Rest of India in 2016–17 Irani Cup. His most memorable performance was in punjab and from there he got a nick name Mohit Bansal Chandigarh. Although he played only one first class match in India but his contribution for district cricket is unmemorable.

References 

1991 births
Gujarat cricketers
Cricketers from Rajasthan
People from Ajmer
Living people